Allahabad-e Mostowfi (also Romanized as Allāhābād-e Mostowfī; also known as Allāhābād) is a village in Borj-e Akram Rural District, in the Central District of Fahraj County, Kerman Province, Iran. At the 2006 census, its population was 455, in 111 families.

References 

Populated places in Fahraj County